Jean-Adam Guilain (real name Johann Adam Wilhelm Freinsberg) (c. 1680 – after 1739) was a German organist and harpsichordist who was mostly active in Paris during the first half of the eighteenth century.

Little is known about his life. He was born in Germany, possibly around 1680 (the exact dates of birth and death are unknown). For an unknown reason he moved to France some time before 1702, and almost certainly became one of Louis Marchand's pupils - Guilain's organ collection is dedicated to Marchand, by then a prominent organ teacher. Guilain died some time after 1739, the year when he published a collection of harpsichord pieces. A unique copy may be found in the collection of the British Library.  The volume is entitled "PIECES DE CLAVECIN / D'UN GOUT NOUVEAU / PAR Mr. GUILAIN./ Gravées par De Gland Graveur du Roy./ Prix 3l./ A PARIS. The 26 pieces of this anthology, carry the following titles:

Fanfare - Je veux Garder - Le Beau B.T. - Amis - Ton H.C. - Babé L.R. - Joconde - Mirtil - Mon Cousin - Tircis Couché - Ma Cloris - L'autre jour - Mamy Margot -  O Gué - Pierre B.- Les Pelerins 1er Air - 2e Air - Boire a son tour - je suis encor - Bransle de Metz - On dit - Allons - La Tétard - Menuet Allemand

Although he came from Germany, Guilain's musical style appears to be in the pure French tradition.

A single collection of organ pieces (Pièces d'orgue pour le Magnificat sur les huit tons différents de l'église) was published in 1706 in two volumes, of which only one is now extant. The full collection included eight suites of pieces for use with the Magnificat, one suite for each church mode. Each suite contained seven short movements that were to alternate with the vocal parts of the liturgy.

Suite du premier ton :
 Plein jeu - Trio - Duo - Basse de trompette - Récit - Dialogue - Petit plein jeu
Suite du deuxième ton :
 Prélude - Tierce en taille - Duo - Basse de trompette - Trio de flûtes - Dialogue - Petit plein jeu
Suite du troisième ton :
 Plein jeu - Quatuor - Dialogue de voix humaine - Basse de trompette - Duo - Grand jeu - Petit plein jeu
Suite du quatrième ton :
 Plein jeu - Cromorne en taille - Duo - Basse de cromorne - Trio - Dialogue - Petit plein jeu

See also
French organ school
French baroque harpsichordists

External links
 Recordings of several pieces composed by Guilain
 

1680s births
18th-century deaths
Year of birth uncertain
Year of death unknown
French Baroque composers
French male classical composers
18th-century classical composers
18th-century French composers
18th-century French male musicians
17th-century male musicians